Oreolalax is a genus of amphibian in the family Megophryidae. They are mostly endemic to southwestern China, with one species in northern Vietnam (Oreolalax sterlingae), and possibly extending into adjacent Laos. There is also a population in Arunachal Pradesh (Northeast India) that has not yet been assigned to a species, although it might rather be a Scutiger.

Species
The genus contains the following 19 species:

Endemic ranges
Many Oreolalax species are endemic to highly restricted geographical areas in the Eastern Himalayas, especially in Sichuan, China. The ranges often overlap with those of Scutiger species.

Yunnan, China
 Oreolalax granulosus: Ailao Mountains, Jingdong County, Yunnan
 Oreolalax jingdongensis: Ailao Mountains, Jingdong County, Yunnan
Sichuan, China
 Oreolalax nanjiangensis: Mount Guangwu (光雾山), Nanjiang County, Sichuan
 Oreolalax chuanbeiensis: Pingwu County and Mao County, Sichuan
 Oreolalax liangbeiensis: Puxiong (普雄镇), Yuexi County, Sichuan
 Oreolalax longmenmontis: Pengzhou, Sichuan
 Oreolalax puxiongensis: Puxiong (普雄镇), Yuexi County, Sichuan
 Oreolalax pingii: Zhaojue County and Yuexi County, Sichuan
 Oreolalax multipunctatus: Emeishan and Hongya counties, Sichuan
 Oreolalax omeimontis: Emeishan and Hongya counties, Sichuan
 Oreolalax major: central Sichuan
 Oreolalax schmidti: central Sichuan
 Oreolalax weigoldi: Washan, Sichuan

References

Megophryidae
 
Amphibians of Asia
Amphibian genera
Taxa named by Alan E. Leviton
Taxa named by George S. Myers
Taxonomy articles created by Polbot